New Alternative Party may refer to:

 New Alternative Party (South Korea), South Korean political party
 New Alternative Party (Thailand), Thai political party